The Conservative Party 2019 General Election Campaign was led by Boris Johnson as the Leader of the Conservative Party in the 2019 United Kingdom general election. Johnson led the campaign to victory, with the Conservatives obtaining 365 seats; a majority of 80 seats.

Background
The General Election was called by Boris Johnson to break the deadlock in parliament over the issue of Brexit. Johnson believed that he could achieve the necessary votes required to pass his Brexit Deal if the Conservatives won an overall majority at a general election. Parliament agreed to an election through a motion proposed by the Liberal Democrats and Scottish National parties on 28 October. The Early Parliamentary General Election Act 2019 (EPGEA) was passed in the Commons by 438 votes to 20; an attempt to pass an amendment by opposition parties for the election to be held on 9 December failed in the Commons by 315 votes to 295. The House of Lords passed the bill unamended on 30 October, with Royal assent given the day after for the ratification of the EPGEA.

Timeline
The election began officially on Wednesday 6 November after the dissolution of Parliament. The campaign got off to a less than ideal start, after the Secretary of State for Wales Alun Cairns had to resign on the same day as dissolution over claims he had knowledge of one of his former aides role in the sabotage of a rape trial.

See also
Get Brexit Done

References 

2019 United Kingdom general election
Boris Johnson
History of the Conservative Party (UK)
Election campaigns in the United Kingdom